Walther Katzenstein (8 October 1878 in Lisbon, Portugal – 9 August 1929 in Hamburg) was a German rower who competed in the 1900 Summer Olympics.

He was part of the German boat Germania Ruder Club, Hamburg, which won the gold medal in the coxed four final B.

References

External links

 

1878 births
1929 deaths
Olympic rowers of Germany
Rowers at the 1900 Summer Olympics
Olympic gold medalists for Germany
Olympic medalists in rowing
German male rowers
Medalists at the 1900 Summer Olympics
Sportspeople from Lisbon
German expatriates in Portugal
Rowers from Hamburg